Joseph Sparke or Sparkes (1683–1740) was an English antiquary, editor of some significant chronicles.

Life
He was son of John Sparke or Sparkes of Peterborough. Having been educated in his native city under a Mr. Warren, he was admitted a pensioner at St. John's College, Cambridge, on 11 July 1699, and graduated B.A. in 1704. Returning to Peterborough, he became registrar of Peterborough Cathedral.

He devoted much time to antiquarian studies. In 1719, in a letter of Maurice Johnson to William Stukeley, he is mentioned as having lately arranged on a new method Lord Cardigan's library at Dean in Northamptonshire. He was also entrusted with the care of White Kennett's collection of early historical and theological documents that passed to the cathedral library, which he was to supply daily and augment. Kennett's biographer William Newton describes Sparke as ‘of very good literature and very able to assist in that good design’. Together with his friend Timothy Neve, Sparke was the founder of the Gentleman's Society of Peterborough, and prevailed on Bishop Robert Clavering to allow it to meet in a room over the Saxon gate-house. In October 1722 he had become a member of the Spalding Gentlemen's Society, on which it was modelled.

Sparke died on 20 July 1740, and was buried in Peterborough Cathedral, where there is a monument to him in the retro-choir. His wife Rebecca died on 27 March 1747, aged 56.

Works
In 1723 he edited two folio volumes entitled Historiæ Anglicanæ Scriptores varii, e codicibus manuscriptis, of which both large and small paper editions were published. They contained the Chronicon Angliae Petriburgense, which later was attributed erroneously to John, abbot of Peterborough (1250–1262), by Simon Patrick and Henry Wharton. This was printed by Sparke from a transcript furnished to him by John Bridges of Lincoln's Inn, and, not having been collated with the original (among the Cotton. MSS. in the British Museum), contains errors. It was re-edited in 1845 for the Caxton Society by John Allen Giles. The Historiæ Anglicanæ Scriptores included also William Fitzstephen's Life of St. Thomas Becket, the History of Peterborough Abbey by Hugh Candidus, Walter of Guisborough's Vita Eduardi, and the chronicles of Ralph of Coggeshall, Benedict of Peterborough, and others. Another volume contemplated by Sparke was to contain Whittleseye's Hereward of Peterborough.

Notes

References

1683 births
1740 deaths
English antiquarians